Mikulin may refer to:
Alexander Mikulin, Soviet aircraft-engine designer
Mikulin, Kraśnik County in Lublin Voivodeship (east Poland)
Mikulin, Łódź Voivodeship (central Poland)
Mikulin, Tomaszów Lubelski County in Lublin Voivodeship (east Poland)
An interglacial period on the East European Plain 130,000–114,000 years ago — see Eemian